Poonsak Masuk, born Sarawut Masuk, simply known as Nui, is a Thai professional footballer who plays as a winger for Chiangmai United in Thai League 1.

Club career

Muangthong United
Sarawut joined Muangthong United in 2012.

International

He made international debut for Thailand in friendly match against Jordan on 6 October 2011. He scored a goal against China for Thailand in a friendly match. He represented Thailand U23 in the 2013 Southeast Asian Games. Sarawut is also part of Thailand's squad in the 2014 AFF Suzuki Cup. In May 2015, he was called up by Thailand to play in the 2018 FIFA World Cup qualification (AFC) against Vietnam.

International

International goals

Under-23

Senior

Honours

Clubs
Muangthong United
 Thai League T1 (1): 2012

International
Thailand U-23
 Sea Games  Gold Medal (1); 2013

Thailand
 ASEAN Football Championship (2): 2014, 2016
 King's Cup (1): 2016

References

External links
 
 

1990 births
Living people
Poonsak Masuk
Poonsak Masuk
Association football wingers
Poonsak Masuk
Poonsak Masuk
Poonsak Masuk
Poonsak Masuk
Poonsak Masuk
Poonsak Masuk
Poonsak Masuk
Poonsak Masuk
Poonsak Masuk
Poonsak Masuk
Poonsak Masuk
Southeast Asian Games medalists in football
Competitors at the 2013 Southeast Asian Games